Keith Vickerman FRS FRSE FMedSci (21 March 1933 – 28 June 2016) was a British zoologist born in Huddersfield, Yorkshire. He was Regius Professor of Zoology in the University of Glasgow, 1984–98. He was awarded the Linnean Medal in 1996. A Fellow of the Academy of Medical Sciences, he was one of the organization's founding members.

Vickerman was the one who made the discovery that antigenic variation could occur in eukaryotic cells, namely in protozoa.

References

1933 births
2016 deaths
Academics of the University of Glasgow
British zoologists
Fellows of the Royal Society
Fellows of the Royal Society of Edinburgh
Linnean Medallists